Seiroku Tameike  is an earthfill dam located in Miyazaki Prefecture in Japan. The dam is used for irrigation. The catchment area of the dam is 4.9 km2. The dam impounds about 9  ha of land when full and can store 907 thousand cubic meters of water. The construction of the dam was completed in 1959.

See also
List of dams in Japan
List of dams in Miyazaki Prefecture

References

Dams in Miyazaki Prefecture